Cheerappanchira is a noble Ezhava  tharavad renowned for its Kalari in Muhamma, Alappuzha District. Recently, the family Kalari was reopened and around 40 students are being trained in the martial art of Kalarippayattu. The former minister of Kerala, Susheela Gopalan, hails from the Cheerappanchira family.

According to a mythology, Maalikapurathamma is the daughter of Cheerappanchira Panikkar who taught Kalaripayattu to Lord Ayyappa. Cheerappanchira, which is situated about 100 km from Sabarimala holds many rights in Sabarimala, such as to conduct fireworks at Sabarimala, to light Nilavilak and ceremonial lamps at the shrine of Malikapurathamma at Sabarimala, collect half the coconuts given by devotees at Malikapurathamma shrine at Sabarimala. There is also a Mukkalvetti Ayyappa temple at Cheerappanchira which hold 3/4 power of Lord Ayyappa and rest in Sabarimala.

Sabarimala and Mukkal Vettom temples

Mukkal Vettom Ayyappa Temple was built by the Cheerappanchira in the tharavadu because the elders of the family were not able to go for pilgrimage to Sabarimala.

The importance of the relation of these two ancient temples is evidenced by the Thirupattaya Charthu (the royal decree) of the Pandalam King, by which the right to conduct the fireworks offerings at Sabarimala was given to Cheerappanchira family. Till this date, people of old age and women who can't undertake a pilgrimage to Sabarimala come to this temple to offer their prayers on the belief that, by the darshan at Mukkal vettom,  Ayyappan will shower  the same blessings as the darsan at Sabarimala. In 2001, as instructed by the Ashtamangala Deva Prasnam, (the astrological findings) held at Sabarimala, Sabarimala temple authorities conducted special poojas and offerings as penance at this temple.

Swamy Muttom or Mutt
The Kudil (Hermitage) where Ayyappan lived during the period of his martial art training has been preserved in its original form by successive generations of the Cheerappanchira family. Sree Narayana Guru, during his visit to this family, used this Kudil. Hence it has got the name Swamy Muttom.

See also
Makara Jyothi

References

External links
 Mukkal Vettam Sri Ayyappa Temple and Cheerappanchira Kalari, Muhamma
  Sri Ayyappa Temple, Cheerappanchira
 Mukkal Vettam Sri Ayyappa Temple
 Song by Unnikrishnan on Mukkal Vattam

Narayana Guru
Kerala society
Social groups of Kerala